The Street Has Many Dreams (Italian: Molti sogni per le strade) is a 1948 Italian comedy film directed by Mario Camerini and starring Anna Magnani, Massimo Girotti and Checco Rissone. The film's sets were designed by the art director Alberto Boccianti.

Cast

References

Bibliography 
 Miguel Mera & David Burnand. European Film Music. Ashgate Publishing, 2006.

External links 
 

1948 films
Italian comedy films
1948 comedy films
1940s Italian-language films
Films directed by Mario Camerini
Italian black-and-white films
Lux Film films
1940s Italian films